These are the Canadian number-one albums of 1995. The chart was compiled and published by RPM every Monday.

References

See also
List of Canadian number-one singles of 1995

1995
1995 record charts
1995 in Canadian music